Habib Boularès (29 July 1933 – 18 April 2014) was a Tunisian diplomat and politician.

Biography 
He first entered the cabinet in 1970 as Minister of Culture and Information, serving in that post until 1971. He served as the Minister of Foreign Affairs of Tunisia from 1990 to 1991, Minister of Defense for a brief period in 1991, and as Speaker Chamber of Deputies from 1991 to 1997. He served as Secretary-General of the Arab-Maghreb Union from 2002 to 2006, and was succeeded by Habib Ben Yahia. Boularès died, aged 80, in Paris.

References

People from Tunis
1933 births
2014 deaths
Alumni of Sadiki College
École pratique des hautes études alumni
University of Strasbourg alumni
Presidents of the Chamber of Deputies (Tunisia)
Foreign ministers of Tunisia
Government ministers of Tunisia
Ambassadors of Tunisia
Tunisian journalists
20th-century Tunisian writers